HMS Dartmouth was a small frigate or fifth-rate ship, one of six ordered by the English Council of State on 28 December 1654, and built in 1655.

Design
HMS Dartmouth was one of a number of ships built for The Protectorate by John Tippetts, Master Shipwright at Portsmouth Dockyard from 1650 to 1668. Tippetts learned his trade working in Denmark, which employed Dutch ship-building techniques; the archaeological survey indicates these were used to build Dartmouth, the only known English example of such a ship.

The ship's tonnage was 260.7 tons burthen. Originally built for 22 guns, her armament was subsequently increased to 36 guns (19 demi-cannon.

Service

Anglo-Dutch Wars
On April 1666, in the Second Anglo-Dutch War, Dartmouth together with the larger (fourth-rate) frigate  and the 12-gun  Little Gift, captured three Dutch armed merchant ships off the coast of Ireland.

On 28 May 1672, Dartmouth took part in the Battle of Solebay, the opening battle of the Third Anglo-Dutch War.

Barbary Pirates
In 1676–1677, Dartmouth served in the Mediterranean against the Barbary Pirates. She was part of Rear Admiral John Narborough's squadron, which fought pirates based in Tripoli and in Algiers.

Williamite-Jacobite wars
On 1 May 1689, Dartmouth, by now with an armament ofn36 guns, took part in the Battle of Bantry Bay, in which a fleet of 24 French war ships, covering the landing of equipment for Irish Jacobite forces in the south-west of Ireland, fought 19 English war ships. The French had the better of the battle, badly damaging the English ships, but failed to press their advantage.

Later that year, Dartmouth, commanded by Captain John Leake, participated in the relief of the Siege of Derry. The town of Derry (or Londonderry), which lies on the River Foyle near its mouth on Lough Foyle, was besieged by supporters of James II of England and defended by northern Irish Protestants supporting King William.

In May and June 1689 Dartmouth escorted a convoy from England to Ireland that brought a relief force, commanded by Major-General Percy Kirke, destined for Derry. On 17 May 1689, the convoy sailed from Liverpool with 24 transport ships, escorted by three men-of-war, HMS Swallow, HMS Bonaventure, and HMS Dartmouth. The fleet, carrying four battalions (about 2000 men), arrived in Lough Foyle early in June.

As the access to Derry from Lough Foyle by the river was defended by shore batteries and blocked by a boom across the river, Kirke did not dare use this route to approach the town. However, a desperate last-minute attempt succeeded on the 28 July. The Dartmouth engaged the shore batteries, while the armed merchant ship Mountjoy rammed and breached the boom. The Mountjoy and another armed merchant, the Phoenix, forced their way past the defences and relieved the siege.

In 1690, Dartmouth was employed in operations along the west coast of Scotland against Jacobite rebels. On 9 October, Dartmouth and two other smaller ships were sent to persuade the MacLeans of Duart to sign Articles of Allegiance to William III and Mary II. They encountered a heavy storm whilst in the Sound of Mull, and anchored to ride out the poor weather. Dartmouth was driven onto rocks and wrecked, with the loss of most of her crew, including her commanding officer, Edward Pottinger.

Discovery of the Wreck

In 1973, divers from Bristol discovered a wreck on the north coast of Eilean Rudha an Ridire, an island in the Sound of Mull. A recovered brass ship's bell confirmed the wreck as the Dartmouth. The site underwent three years of archaeological survey. Twenty iron guns were identified, and parts of the ship's hull were recovered for closer examination. A varied selection of 17th century military, navigational, medical and domestic items were also recovered. The archaeological study supported traditional accounts of the ship's wrecking, and revealed that parts of Dartmouth's construction differed from conventional methods used during the period.

On 11 April 1974, the wrecksite was one of the first to be designated under the Protection of Wrecks Act. It was redesignated on 25 June 1992. The site became a Historic Maritime Protected Area in 2013.

References

Sources
  
 
 
 

 Rif Winfield, British Warships in the Age of Sail 1603-1714: Design, Construction, Careers and Fates. Seaforth Publishing, 2009. .
 Advisory Committee on Historic Wrecks Report for 1999-2000

Further reading

External links
 
 Dartmouth: Eilean Rubha An Ridire, Sound Of Mull. Canmore.

Archaeology of shipwrecks
Protected Wrecks of Scotland
Shipwrecks in the Atlantic Ocean
Maritime incidents in 1690
1650s ships
1690 in Scotland
History of Argyll and Bute
1973 in Scotland
Historic Marine Protected Areas of Scotland